Radical 136 or radical oppose meaning "" is one of the 29 Kangxi radicals (214 radicals in total) composed of 6 strokes.

In the Kangxi Dictionary, there are 10 characters (out of 49,030) to be found under this radical.

 is not listed as an indexing component in the Table of Indexing Chinese Character Components predominantly adopted by Simplified Chinese dictionaries published in mainland China.

Evolution

Derived characters

Literature

External links

Unihan Database - U+821B

136